Tomasz Witold Wieszczycki (born 21 December 1971 in Łódź) is former Polish football player.

Career

National team
Wieszczycki appeared in 11 matches for the Poland national football team, scoring three goals.

References

External links
 

1971 births
Living people
Polish footballers
Poland international footballers
ŁKS Łódź players
Legia Warsaw players
Le Havre AC players
Polonia Warsaw players
Dyskobolia Grodzisk Wielkopolski players
Olympic footballers of Poland
Olympic silver medalists for Poland
Footballers at the 1992 Summer Olympics
Polish expatriate footballers
Olympic medalists in football
Footballers from Łódź
Medalists at the 1992 Summer Olympics
Association football midfielders